Change is a political party in Guatemala.

History
Change was established in 2020, the leader and founder is Carlos Pineda, a businessman from Izabal. On 1 July 2022, the Supreme Electoral Tribunal legalized the political party.

Jorge Eduardo and Manuel Antonio Baldizón, sons of former presidential candidate Manuel Baldizón, are members of the political party.

Party's presumptive presidential candidate Carlos Pineda announced his resign from the party through social networks in January 2023. Days before, Pineda alleged that he would leave the political party if Manuel Baldizón directly influenced the political group.

Election results

President of the Republic of Guatemala

Congress of the Republic

References

External links

2020 establishments in Guatemala
Political parties established in 2020
Political parties in Guatemala